A stop with no audible release, also known as an unreleased stop or an applosive, is a stop consonant with no release burst: no audible indication of the end of its occlusion (hold).

Audibly released stops, on the other hand, are not normally indicated. If a final stop is aspirated, the aspiration diacritic  is sufficient to indicate the release. Otherwise, the "unaspirated" diacritic of the Extended IPA may be employed for this: apt .

English
Although such sounds are frequently described as "unreleased", the reality is that since the two consonants overlap, the release of the former takes place during the hold of the latter, masking the former's release and making it inaudible. That can lead to cross-articulations that seem very much like deletions or complete assimilation.

For example, hundred pounds may sound like  but X-ray and electropalatographic studies demonstrate that since inaudible and possibly-weakened contacts may still be made, the second  in hundred pounds does not entirely assimilate a labial place of articulation but co-occurs with it.

In American English, a stop in syllable-final position is typically realized as an unreleased stop; that is especially the case for /t/, but in that position, it is also analyzed as experiencing glottal reinforcement. 

Such sounds may occur between vowels, as in some pronunciations of out a lot. However, its release is masked by the glottal stop. (See: T-glottalization, in some dialects).

The term "unreleased" is also used for a stop before a homorganic nasal, as in catnip. In such cases, however, the stop is released as a nasal in a nasal release and so it would be more precisely transcribed .

Other languages
In most languages in East and Southeast Asia with final stops, such as Cantonese, Hokkien, Korean, Malay, Thai, and West Coast Bajau, the stops are not audibly released: mak . That is true even between vowels. That is thought to be caused by an overlapping glottal stop and is more precisely transcribed . A consequence of an inaudible release is that any aspirated–unaspirated distinction is neutralized. Some languages, such as Vietnamese, which are reported to have unreleased final stops, turn out to have short voiceless nasal releases instead. The excess pressure is released (voicelessly) through the nose and so there is no audible release to the stop.

Formosan languages
The Formosan languages of Taiwan, such as Tsou and Amis, are unusual in that all obstruents are released but not aspirated, as in Tsou  "four" and  "to pierce", or Amis  "one" and  "four". (The symbol for a release burst, is acknowledged but not supported by the IPA.)

Gyalrong languages
In Gyalrongic languages, plosives and nasal stops could be unreleased after a glottal stop, for example:
 > 
 >

Pirahã

See also
 Checked tone
 Glottal reinforcement
 Lateral release (phonetics)
 Nasal release
 T-glottalization

References

Sources

External links
 'Unreleased' (John C. Wells)
 'No (audible) release' (John C. Wells)
 'Unreleased stops' (University of Manitoba)

Plosives